Mokna Union is a union of Nagarpur Upazila, Tangail District, Bangladesh. It is situated 12 km east of Nagarpur and 36 km southeast of Tangail city.

Demographics

According to the Population Census of 2011 performed by Bangladesh Bureau of Statistics, the total population of the Mokna union is 22,040 and there are 5,246 households in total.

Education

The literacy rate of Mokna Union is 42.4% (Male-46%, Female-39.3%).

See also
 Union Councils of Tangail District

References

Populated places in Dhaka Division
Populated places in Tangail District
Unions of Nagarpur Upazila